RHEM 4: The Golden Fragments is an adventure game designed for PC and Mac by Knut Müller.

Plot
The game begins with Kales giving you the note and the black crystal explaining the reason why he needs you to come back to RHEM. After you arrive to RHEM by railcar, Kales informs you on a projector the task that you need to fulfill, in this case gather nine golden fragments.

Gameplay
The game objective is to collect all nine golden fragments to safely return to the outside world.

Reception
RHEM 4 have received quite favorable reviews from both critics and gamers alike:

Gamers:
Gameboomers

Critics:
The game received 7.5 from Gamers Daily News and 58% from Electronic Theatre the later of which said that the game is not groundbreaking but it undoubtedly achieves everything it set out to do.

References

External links
Official site of the series
English site
Lace Mamba site

2010 video games
First-person adventure games
MacOS games
Video games developed in Germany
Windows games